Thomas Alexander Gibson (30 January 1880, Gateshead – ) was a British international rugby player.

He was born in Gateshead , Durham . His brothers were international rugby players Charles and George Ralph Gibson.

He played rugby as a forward for Northern. In 1903 he took part in the British Lions tour of South Africa, playing 3 games. He was then capped twice for England for the 1905 Home Nations Championship.

References

 ESPN Scrum - England/Players and Officials/Thomas Gibson
 Charles Gibson : Rugby Player

1880 births
1937 deaths
British & Irish Lions rugby union players from England
England international rugby union players
English rugby union players
Rugby union players from Gateshead